Dieudonne Kayembe Mbandakulu Tshisuma (born 9 April 1945) was the Chief of General Staff of the Armed Forces of the Democratic Republic of Congo. Since 12 June 2007 he has the rank of Lieutenant General.

Dieudonne Kayembe was born on 9 April 1945 at Élisabethville, Haut-Katanga District. He attended primary school at the Athénée de Lubumbashi, which he followed with secondary schooling at Mbuji-Mayi in Kasai-Oriental Province. He later entered the prestigious École spéciale militaire de Saint-Cyr officer academy, in France. After he finished that training, he was admitted to a branch school, specifically the Cavalry School at Saumur, still in France.

Since that time pursuing a military career, Kayembe entered, later on, after passing the entrance exam, the Command and General Staff College at Fort Knox, in the United States.
Following his training in that school he received his staff officer’s brevet.

Career
After the arrival in power of Laurent Kabila in May 1997, then-Colonel Kayembe was named deputy director of the Defence Minister’s office, and promoted to Brigadier General.

He was named successively Vice-Minister of Defence and (then ?) of Reconstruction. Chief of Staff of the HQ of the Congolese Armed Forces in 2002, he later assumed the functions of Director-General of the Military Detection of Unpatriotic Activities (DEMIAP), the Congolese military intelligence service.

On 12 June 2007 he was raised in grade to Lieutenant General and named eighteenth Chief of Staff of the FARDC by President Joseph Kabila, supreme commander of the armed forces.

He was replaced in 2008 by General Didier Etumba Longomba.

An announcement of his retirement was made by Ordonnance 13/082 of 13 July 2013.

References and links
Fr-Wikipedia
Story on appointment & photo
http://www.ssrnetwork.net/practitioners_course/dr_congo_.php - course with Lt Gen Mbandakulu's involvement

Citations and notes

|-
1

1945 births
Living people
People from Lubumbashi
Democratic Republic of the Congo military personnel
Non-U.S. alumni of the Command and General Staff College
21st-century Democratic Republic of the Congo people